Aberdeen Community Health and Care Village also known as The Health Village is a community hospital located in the centre of Aberdeen, Scotland. It is managed by NHS Grampian.

History
Plans for the complex were announced in 2010. The facility, which cost £15 million to construct, opened in December 2013. It was the first healthcare facility to be completed in Scotland under the hub framework of the Scottish Futures Trust.

Services
The health village, which is designed to offer services to 700 patients a day, contains 275 rooms including three dental suites, two minor procedure rooms and 29 consulting rooms. Services being run from the health village include: cardiac rehabilitation, dentistry, dietetics, physiotherapy, podiatry, radiology, sexual health, speech and language therapy and minor surgery. An endoscopy service was provided from June 2014.

The health village acts as an educational resource for patients, carers and community-based staff. The health village also provides improved access to community based learning opportunities for healthcare professionals such as general practitioners (GPs) and GP trainees.

Mural 
Work on a mural on the side of the building began in July 2021. It is being painted by Fanakapan, a London-based artist, as part of the 2021 NuArt Festival.

References

External links
Aberdeen Community Health and Care Village Official information for patients, carers, visitors and members of the public

Hospital buildings completed in 2013
Hospitals in Aberdeen
NHS Grampian
NHS Scotland hospitals